Petrič or Petrč or Petrić was a strategic military complex consisting of two late medieval fortresses in Nerodimlje Župa of the Kingdom of Serbia. The role of the main fortress Veliki Petrič (or Velika Kaleja) and a smaller fortress Mali Petrič (or Mala Kaleja) was to protect the court of the King of Serbia in Nerodimlja.

Location and construction 

Two fortresses were built on two adjacent hills of the southern slopes of Crnoljeva mountain, above the king's court Nerodimlje and also above the confluence of two streams (Mala Reka and Golema Reka) that form Nerodimka river, west of the modern day town Urosevac in Kosovo. Mali Petrič was built around 3.5 km south of the bigger fortress Veliki Petrič.

The remnants of both Veliki and Mali Petrič are covered with forest. Based on the configuration of the land it can be assumed that Veliki Petrič had triangular shape. It was built of large stones and lime mortar. Konstantin Jireček described remnants of four towers of this fort.

History 

Kingdom of Serbia had numerous temporary courts in its administrative districts known as župas. In Nerodimlje župa there were three courts of King Milutin: Nerodimlje (below Petrič), Svrčin (on the island of Svrčin lake) and Pauni. The fourth court within this complex was several kilometers north of Pauni, on the location of modern day Štimlje village.

Petrič was often mentioned in connection with the struggle between Stefan Dušan and his father Stefan Dečanski over the throne of Serbia. In 1331 Stefan Dušan came from Skadar to Nerodimlje to overthrow his father Stefan Dečanski who fled to Petrič with a small number of men. It is unknown whether it was Veliki or Mali Petrič. Dušan first captured the court in Nerodimlje with its treasury and besieged Petrič which he captured on 21 August 1331 and imprisoned his father in Zvečan Fortress, where he was strangled.

Administration 

Petrič belonged to the following states:

 Since its establishment at the end of the 13th century until 1346 Petrič was part of the Kingdom of Serbia
 In period 1346–1371 it belonged to the Serbian Empire
 In period 1371–1412 Petrič was part of the District of Branković governed by Vuk Branković
 In period 1412–1441 it belonged to the Serbian Despotate.

Petrič was again mentioned when the valley below the fortress was registered (as the valley of Petric) in 1485 Ottoman defter. According to this defter this valley was populated with 13 Serbian and one Albanian household.

See also 
 Cultural monuments of the Kosovo district

References 

Buildings and structures completed in the 13th century
Forts in Kosovo
Architecture in Serbia
Forts in Serbia
Ferizaj
Medieval Serbian architecture
Nemanjić dynasty endowments
Cultural Monuments of Exceptional Importance (Serbia)